Japanese singer and songwriter Tsuyoshi Domoto has released thirteen studio albums, fifteen video albums, one compilation album, one cover album, one EP, and thirteen singles. His career began as a member of KinKi Kids. Domoto's first studio album, Rosso e Azzurro (2002), peaked at number one on the Oricon Albums Chart.

Albums

Studio albums

Cover albums

Compilation albums

Extended plays

Singles

Promotional singles

Videoography

Videos

Documentaries

Television series

Notes

References

Discographies of Japanese artists